Presidential elections were held in Azerbaijan on 3 October 1993. The result was a victory for Heydar Aliyev of the New Azerbaijan Party. Voter turnout was reported to be 97.6%.

Results

References

Azerbaijan
Azerbaijan
1993 in Azerbaijan
Presidential elections in Azerbaijan
October 1993 events in Europe
October 1993 events in Asia
Election and referendum articles with incomplete results